Germania is an unincorporated community located in the town of Shields, Marquette County, Wisconsin, United States.

Demographics
Germania's population as of July 2009 is 382 which is an increase of 12.7% from about 330. Germania's population as of 2009 is overwhelmingly white compared to other races with a little over 97% white with only 10 other people being another race. As of July 2009 200 people or 52.5% of the population are male while 182 people or 47.5% of the population are female. The unemployment rate of the town as of 2013 is about 7.2%.

Notable people
Clarence V. Peirce, farmer, businessman, and politician, lived in Germania.

Notes

Unincorporated communities in Marquette County, Wisconsin
Unincorporated communities in Wisconsin